Lago di Scandarello is a reservoir in the Province of Rieti, Lazio, Italy. It was created in 1924 when a dam was built across Scandarello torrente, a tributary of the Tronto. It is near Amatrice. The lake is 3 km long and its surface area is 1 km². The volume of the lake is 0.012 km3 and its maximum depth is 41 m. The lake is at an elevation of 868 m above sea level.

References 

Lakes of Lazio